The two-step floating catchment area (2SFCA) method is a method for combining a number of related types of information into a single, immediately meaningful, index that allows comparisons to be made across different locations. Its importance lies in the improvement over considering the individual sources of information separately, where none on its own provides an adequate summary.

Background

The two-step floating catchment area (2SFCA) method is a special case of a gravity model of spatial interaction that was developed to measure spatial accessibility to primary care physicians. 2SFCA can also be used to measure other accessibility such as accessibility to jobs, to cancer care facilities, etc. It was inspired by the spatial decomposition idea first proposed by Radke and Mu (2000).

The 2SFCA method not only has most of the advantages of a gravity model, but is also intuitive to interpret, as it uses essentially a special form of physician-to-population ratio. It is easy to implement in a GIS environment. In essence, the 2SFCA method measures spatial accessibility as a ratio of primary-care physicians to population, combining two steps:
it first assesses “physician availability” at the physicians' (supply) locations as the ratio of physicians to their surrounding population (i.e., within a threshold travel time from the physicians)
it sums up the ratios (i.e., physician availability derived in the first step) around (i.e., within the same threshold travel time from) each residential (demand) location.

It has been recently enhanced by considering distance decay within catchments and called the enhanced two-step floating catchment area (E2SFCA) method.

Furthermore, the use of capping certain services according to nearby population size, can improve the accuracy when analyzing across areas of different environments (i.e. rural and urban).

The method has been applied to other related public health issues, such as access to healthy food retailers.

See also
Primary care service area
Gravity model of migration

Notes

References
 Luo, W., Wang, F., 2003a. Spatial accessibility to primary care and physician shortage area designation: a case study in Illinois with GIS approaches. In: Skinner, R., Khan, O. (Eds.), Geographic Information Systems and Health Applications. Idea Group Publishing, Hershey, PA, pp. 260–278.
 
 
 
 
Wang, F. 2006. Quantitative Methods and Applications in GIS. London: CRC Press. 
 
 

Geostatistics
Accessibility
Urban studies and planning terminology